Configuration space may refer to:
 Configuration space (physics)
 Configuration space (mathematics), the space of arrangements of points on a topological space
 PCI configuration space, the underlying way that the Conventional PCI, PCI-X and PCI Express perform auto configuration of the cards inserted into their bus